The Jaguar XJR-9 is a sports-prototype race car built by Jaguar for both FIA Group C and IMSA Camel GTP racing, debuting at the 1988 24 Hours of Daytona.

Development
An evolution of the design for the XJR-8, the XJR-9 was designed by Tony Southgate, built by Tom Walkinshaw Racing (TWR) and featured a Jaguar 7.0-litre V12 engine based on the production 5.3-litre engine as used in the Jaguar XJS road car. A variant of the XJR-9, the XJR-9LM, would be developed specifically for the 24 Hours of Le Mans where the requirement for high straight line speeds on the Mulsanne Straight necessitated a low-drag aerodynamic package.

History

In the United States, the Castrol sponsored XJR-9s debuted at the 24 Hours of Daytona, with the car taking the overall win. However, throughout the rest of the IMSA Camel GTP season the XJR-9 was unable to gain another win until the final race of the season, meaning the team had to settle for third in the constructor's championship. In the 1988 World Sports Prototype Championship, the XJR-9, running Silk Cut sponsorship, met with more success. The XJR-9 was able to take six victories, including the 24 Hours of Le Mans, where rookie driver Paul Taylor made his debut aiding in the Le Mans triumph, over the eleven race series. Silk Cut Jaguar won the Teams Championship and Jaguar driver Martin Brundle won the Drivers title. Jaguar's success at Le Mans marked the first time since 1980 that Porsche had not won Le Mans, and the first Le Mans victory for Jaguar since 1957.

For 1989, the XJR-9 was again entered in both IMSA Camel GTP and the World Sports Prototype Championship. However, the XJR-9 was by now dated, and in IMSA was being repeatedly beaten by Nissan, leaving the XJR-9 with only a single win on the season. This led to Jaguar introducing the XJR-10 midway through the season, which met with slightly better success having two wins on the season and usually placing higher than the XJR-9 it ran with. At the end of the season, Jaguar finished 2nd in the championship.

A similar story occurred in the 1989 World Sports Prototype Championship, with Jaguar not winning a single race during the series. Midway through the championship the XJR-11 was developed to replace the XJR-9, although both finished out the season. This disappointment led to Jaguar finishing fourth in the Teams Championship.

Within months of Jaguar's 1988 Le Mans victory, TWR would use the XJR-9 chassis for the development of the R9R prototype which by 1990 had evolved into the XJR-15 sports car and spec-racer.

In 2010, the car won the Le Mans Legend race.

Specifications
Engine
Type: 60 degree SOHC 24 valve V12 
Position: Mid, Longitudinally mounted
Displacement:  (World Sports Prototype Championship)
  (IMSA GTP)
Bore: 
Stroke: 
Compression: 12:1
Injection: Zytek fuel injection
Aspiration: Naturally aspirated
Power:  at 7,200 rpm
Torque:  at 5,500 rpm

Drivetrain
Body: Carbon Composite body
Chassis: Carbon fibre and Kevlar monocoque
Front Suspension: Double wishbones, push-rod activated coil springs over dampers
Rear Suspension: Magnesium uprights, titanium coil springs over dampers
Steering: Rack and pinion power steering
Brakes: TWR ventilated discs
Transmission: March/TWR 5-speed manual transmission
Layout: Rear-wheel drive

Performance figures
Power to weight ratio: 0.85bhp/kg
Top speed:

Gallery

See also
 Jaguar XJR Sportscars

Bibliography

References

External links

Jaguar XJR-9 page at the Jaguar Daimler Heritage Trust site
Jaguar Enthusiasts: Jaguar XJR-9LM
Jaguar XJR-9 Gallery

XJR-09
Group C cars
IMSA GTP cars
Rear mid-engine, rear-wheel-drive vehicles
24 Hours of Le Mans race cars
Le Mans winning cars